Breziny is a village and municipality of the Zvolen District in the Banská Bystrica Region of Slovakia

Genealogical resources

The records for genealogical research are available at the state archive "Statny Archiv in Banska Bystrica, Slovakia"

 Roman Catholic church records (births/marriages/deaths): 1786-1912 (parish B)
 Lutheran church records (births/marriages/deaths): 1784-1860 (parish B)

See also
 List of municipalities and towns in Slovakia

External links
Surnames of living people in Breziny

Villages and municipalities in Zvolen District